Nogometni klub Šmartno, commonly referred to as NK Šmartno or simply Šmartno, is a Slovenian football club from Ljubljana. The club was formed in 1979.

References

External links
Official website 
Weltfussballarchiv profile

Association football clubs established in 1979
Football clubs in Slovenia
Football clubs in Yugoslavia
Football clubs in Ljubljana
1979 establishments in Slovenia